Ram Narayan began to record music when he played on three solo 78 rpm gramophone records for the British HMV Group in 1950 and recorded an early 10 inch LP album in Mumbai in 1951. Over the following decades Narayan had numerous solo recordings published.

Availability
Narayan's gramophone records and LP recordings are out of print. Three LPs were rereleased on CD: Volume 1, a partial rerelease of Ram Narayan en Concert, in 1989, and Inde du Nord in 1998 and Raga Puria Kalyan in 1999. Since the 2000s, the releases by Music Today, Nimbus Records, The Gramophone Company, Universal Music India, and Venus Records have become available in online music stores. The content of The Gramophone Company is available as streaming media from its successor Sa Re Ga Ma at no charge.

List of recordings

Footnotes

References

Discographies of Indian artists